The Kuwait National Cultural District (also known as the KNCD) is multibillion-dollar development project that focuses on the arts and culture in Kuwait. With a capital cost of more than US$1 billion, the project is one of the largest cultural investments in the world today. The Kuwait National Cultural District is a member of the Global Cultural Districts Network.

The District has three cultural clusters:
 Western shores: Sheikh Jaber Al-Ahmad Cultural Centre and Al Salam Palace
 Eastern shores: Sheikh Abdullah Al-Salem Cultural Centre
 Edge of the City Centre: Al Shaheed Park Museums: Habitat Museum and Remembrance Museum

The Sheikh Jaber Al Ahmad Cultural Centre is the largest cultural center and opera house in the Middle East. The Abdullah Al-Salem Cultural Centre is a  site with a total exhibit area of 22,000 m2, making it the world's largest museum project. Al Shaheed Park is the largest green roof project ever undertaken in the Arab world. The new cultural district is an essential part of Kuwait Vision 2035.

Gallery

Sheikh Jaber Al-Ahmad Cultural Centre

See also
 Madinat al-Hareer
 Sheikh Jaber Al-Ahmad Al-Sabah Causeway
 Mubarak Al Kabeer Port
 Sabah Al Ahmad Sea City
 Al Mutlaa City

References

Kuwait City
Entertainment venues in Kuwait
Buildings and structures in Kuwait City
Museums in Kuwait
Cultural centers in Kuwait
Kuwaiti culture